Below is the list of populated places in Kocaeli Province, Turkey by the districts. İzmit is the capital of the province. In the following lists, the first place in each district list is the administrative center of that district.

İzmit

Başiskele

Derince

Dilovası

Gebze

Gölcük

Kandıra

Kartepe

Körfez

Recent development

According to Law act no 6360, all Turkish provinces with a population more than 750 000, were renamed as metropolitan municipality. All districts in those provinces became second level municipalities and all villages in those districts  were renamed as a neighborhoods. Thus the villages listed above are officially neighborhoods of Kocaeli.

References

List
Kocaeli